Soraya Moraes (born January 29, 1973) is a Brazilian gospel singer.

Moraes was born in São Paulo and sang in church as a child. Her professional career began in a band called Metanoya in 1992; their debut album, Guerra, was released in 1993. In 1998, she signed with Gospel Records as a solo artist, and her debut, Pensando em Deus, was released in 1999. Her 2004 release Deixa o Teu Rio Me Levar was awarded a Latin Grammy in 2007 for best Portuguese language Christian album. She also won four Troféu Talento awards. Moraes is a member of the Foursquare Church.

Awards
Latin Grammy Awards of 2008 - Best Christian Album (Spanish Language) with Tengo Sed de Tí
Latin Grammy Awards of 2008 - Best Christian Album (Portuguese Language) with Som da chuva (Line Records)
Latin Grammy Awards of 2008 - Best Brazilian Song with "Som da Chuva"
Latin Grammy Awards of 2005 - Best Christian Album (Portuguese Language) with Deixa o Teu Rio me Levar (Line Records)

Discography

Albums

Extended plays

International

Collections

References

[ Soraya Moraes] at Allmusic

External links
Official website

1973 births
Living people
Brazilian gospel singers
Latin Grammy Award winners
Singers from São Paulo
21st-century Brazilian singers
21st-century Brazilian women singers
Members of the Foursquare Church
Women in Latin music
Latin music songwriters